WFME (1560 kHz) is a non-commercial educational, religious-formatted AM radio station licensed to New York, New York, broadcasting at 1,000 watts, under a special temporary authority (STA). The station is owned and operated by Family Radio, a Christian radio ministry based in Nashville, Tennessee. 

On February 15, 2021, at 11:16 AM, WFME went temporarily silent following the sale of the station's Maspeth, Queens transmitter site by Family Radio for future redevelopment.

On October 26, 2021, the station returned to the air from a new tower site, operating at 1,000 watts under an STA.  On May 27, 2022, the station was granted a license for a term expiring on June 1, 2030. This is to be replaced by a request for return to 50kW operation.

History

WFME began operations as W2XR, an experimental television station, owned by inventor John V. L. Hogan, operating at 2100 kHz, which went on the air on March 26, 1929. Hogan was a radio engineer who owned many patents, and wanted a permit for an experimental station. To avoid interference, the frequency granted in 1934 by the Federal Radio Commission was considerably above the normal broadcasting range, which at that time ended at 1500 kilocycles. Hogan's permit was one of four construction permits; the others, all granted on the same day, were W1XBS Waterbury and W9XBY Kansas City, both on 1530 kHz, and W6XAI Bakersfield, which shared 1550 kHz with W2XR. W2XR was licensed as an "experimental broadcast station" on June 29, 1934. But Hogan was also a connoisseur of music, and he drew on his own record collection to provide the sound for his experiments, which typically lasted for an hour in the evening. W2XR began to broadcast Classical music recordings on 1550 kHz. His television broadcasts came to naught, but Hogan began to hear from unknown individuals who encouraged him to continue broadcasting music.

In 1936, Hogan and Elliott Sanger formed the Interstate Broadcasting Company, with the intention of turning W2XR into a commercial station at a time when there were already about twenty-five radio stations in New York. The transmitter, which used a homemade antenna mounted on a wooden pole, was located in a garage in Long Island City, near the Queensborough Bridge, and its 250 watts provided just enough power to reach midtown Manhattan and parts of Queens. On December 3, 1936, W2XR became WQXR since the cursive form of the letter "Q" mimics the number "2". An FM service, W2XQR, was added in 1939. The North American Regional Broadcasting Agreement of 1941 formally extended the AM band to 1600 kHz, ending the "high-fidelity" service but keeping all four original stations near their existing frequencies. WQXR was originally slated to move to 1600 as a five-kilowatt class III-A regional station, but was able to persuade the FCC to make it a class I-B station on 1560 kHz instead.

"The radio station of The New York Times" (1944–1998)

The New York Post approached the company in the early 1940s about purchasing the stations.  Sanger said publicly that he would have preferred to sell to The New York Times, and in early 1944,  the Times agreed to pay just over $1 million for ownership of Interstate Broadcasting Company.  A transfer application was filed with the FCC on March 1, 1944, including a financial statement showing that the stations had made over $22,000 in profits the previous year, on revenues of $411,000; after FCC approval, the sale was completed on July 25, 1944.  (The Times continued to operate its radio stations under the Interstate Broadcasting name for many years, maintaining what its president called "basic good-music policies," but later used the name The New York Times Radio Company.) It broadcast classical music full-time, along with New York Times news. At 9 PM, the newspaper having been "put to bed", the station would broadcast a brief discussion of the news which would appear on the front page of the next day's issue.

WQXR was the first AM station in New York to experiment with broadcasting in stereo, beginning in 1952. During some of its live concerts, it used two microphones positioned six feet apart. The microphone on the right led to its AM feed, and the one on the left to its FM feed, so a listener could position two radios six feet apart, one tuned to 1560 and the other to 96.3, and listen in stereo.

In 1964, there was controversy when its 11 PM program "Nightcap" was sponsored by Schenley Liquors. Advertising hard liquor was considered a violation of the voluntary NAB standards.

In 1965, the FCC began requiring commonly owned AM and FM stations in large markets to broadcast separate programming for at least part of the day. WQXR-FM concentrated on longer classical works, while WQXR (AM) aired lighter classical music and talk programs produced in conjunction with The New York Times. While this plan gave classical music fans in the New York area two options, it also increased expenses for the stations.

In 1971, the Times put WQXR-AM-FM up for sale. Many offers were received for the FM station, but none of the bids for 1560 AM were satisfactory to management. When the FCC agreed to waive rules prohibiting stations from simulcasting if they were broadcasting classical music, the Times took the WQXR stations off the market. Simulcasting was also allowed, for example, for WGMS and WGMS-FM in Washington.

Transition to WQEW
On December 2, 1992, the AM side broke away from the simulcast for good, changing to an American popular standards format, which was inaugurated by a live studio performance by Tony Bennett. The change came a few months after WNEW (1130 AM), New York's heritage popular standards station, announced an impending sale to Bloomberg L.P. and a format switch to business information with the new call letters WBBR. The format change at 1560 to standards happened 10 days before WNEW's transition. To reflect the heritage of both outlets, WQXR (AM) changed its call sign to WQEW. The station focused on a broad range of pop standards–the format's foundation artists including Frank Sinatra, Nat "King" Cole, Ella Fitzgerald, Dean Martin and Perry Como, but also artists from the big band era (such as Tommy Dorsey, Artie Shaw, Glenn Miller, Louis Armstrong and Duke Ellington); and non-rock-and-roll pop hits (by artists like Neil Diamond, Barbra Streisand, Ray Charles, Bobby Darin and Pat Boone, among others). Light rock and roll material such as the Turtles was also occasionally heard.

Radio Disney (1998–2015) 

Although initially successful, the station's advertising revenues were not spectacular, and older audience demographics were deemed undesirable for long-term success. On December 3, 1998, the Times announced that WQEW would switch to Radio Disney after agreeing to what was initially an eight-year local marketing agreement term with the Walt Disney Company and its ABC Radio subsidiary. The entire WQEW air staff, under orders to not discuss the pending changes on the air, was released on December 21; the station played Christmas music without announcers through the holiday. Regular programming resumed on December 26 and ended on December 27 at 11:59 p.m., when a pre-recorded signoff read by program director and air personality Stan Martin was played. Radio Disney programming launched on WQEW on December 28, 1998.

At the end of the agreement with the Times in late 2006, Disney had the option to purchase the station or to extend the arrangement with the Times maintaining ownership. Disney exercised the option to purchase in early January 2007. Disney/ABC officially became the owner of the station on May 24, 2007.

On August 13, 2014, Disney announced its intention to end terrestrial distribution of the Radio Disney format, in order to focus on digital distribution. Disney would also sell its remaining Radio Disney broadcast outlets, including WQEW and with the lone exception of KDIS in Los Angeles. Disney set a deadline of September 26, 2014, to complete the sales or have deals in principle set or the stations in question, including WQEW, would fall silent. However, Disney backtracked and the stations would remain on the air, continuing to broadcast Radio Disney programming until each were sold.

Family Radio (2015–present)
On November 21, 2014, then-Oakland, California-based Family Stations announced it would purchase WQEW from Disney/ABC for $12.95 million. The transaction had been rumored for at least a month, as it was originally reported by the New York Daily News on October 14, 2014; however, Disney had clarified that it had not yet agreed to the sale. In January 2013 Family Radio sold the original, Newark, New Jersey-licensed WFME (94.7 FM, which it had owned since 1966 but had been programming since 1963) to Cumulus Media, who converted the station into country music-formatted WNSH. In what amounted to a station trade-plus-cash transaction, Family Stations also acquired the license for WDVY (106.3 FM) in Mount Kisco, New York. The 106.3 FM signal, combined in tandem with Family Radio-owned WFRH (91.7 FM) in Kingston, New York mainly serves the Hudson Valley region; another Family Radio outlet, WFRS (88.9 FM) in Smithtown, New York serves Long Island. This left Family Radio programming unavailable over-the-air in New York City proper and northern New Jersey (including Newark) for over two years.

After the FCC approved the sale on February 10, 2015, 1560 AM went silent on February 17 in preparation of the format change. The sale was finalized on February 20 and the call sign was changed to WFME. The station returned to the air on February 27, again giving Family Radio full coverage of the New York City market. Concurrent with the sale, the FCC converted 1560 AM's broadcast license status from commercial to non-commercial educational.
 
Since the initial move from 94.7 in 2013, WFME's originating role with the Family Radio network has been reduced; the station previously originated a portion of the network's overnight program Nightwatch, which was hosted by now-retired station manager/chief engineer Charlie Menut. The entirety of the station's schedule originates from Family Radio headquarters (which in 2016 moved from Oakland to nearby Alameda, California), although WFME does carry local programming to comply with the FCC's public affairs requirements. 

In late November 2020, Family Radio announced the sale of the property surrounding WFME's broadcast towers in Queens, but stipulated that the terms included that Family Radio would still use this site until a suitable alternate location for the station was found. However, no alternate site proved to be immediately available, therefore WFME in early 2021 ended regular programming and began broadcasting a recurring announcement that the station would suspend operations "in just a few days". Although Family Radio officials expressed a desire to eventually return to the New York airwaves, they noted that there were no immediate plans; listeners were directed to access either WFRS in Smithtown and WFME-FM in Mount Kisco, in addition to the Family Radio webstream.  In much of central and southern New Jersey, Family Radio programming can also be heard on WKDN (950 AM) in Philadelphia.

On October 26, 2021, the station returned to air from a new site in West Orange, New Jersey, running at 1,000 watts under an STA.

See also
 John Vincent Lawless Hogan
 Family Radio
 Radio Disney
 The New York Times
 W2XCR
 WQXR-FM
 List of experimental television stations

References

Bibliography

External links
 Family Radio Website

 FCC History Cards for WFME (covering 1934–1981 as W2XR / WQXR)
 WQXR News Department Profile & Interviews (1978)

Clear-channel radio stations
FME
Experimental television stations
History of television in the United States
Television pioneers
Radio stations established in 1934
1929 establishments in New York (state)
Family Radio stations
Former subsidiaries of The Walt Disney Company